Kadamban is a 2017 Indian Tamil-language action drama film written and directed by N. Ragavan. Arya and Catherine Tresa star. The music was composed by Yuvan Shankar Raja, cinematography by S. R. Sathish Kumar, editing by Deva, art directing by A. R. Mohan, and stunt choreography by Dhilip Subbarayan. The movie was dubbed and released in Telugu as Gajendrudu."The Hindi rights of the film were purchased by RK Duggal Studios for a record price. The Hindi trailer was launched on 6 May 2017, and the Hindi dubbed version was released under the same title by RKD studios.

It received mixed reviews, who appreciated performance of Arya, visuals, and music, but criticised for writing, and its similarities between previous Hollywood, and slow pace.

Plot
Kadamban is a native of an isolated tribe in the Kadamban Forest, Tamil Nadu. The area is known for its wildlife and an immense amount of limestone. This brings the attention of the Mahendran Brothers, who own a large cement factory. They then attempt to get the not easily convinced tribe out of the forest. Radhi is in love with Kadamban and attempts continuously to win his heart to the displeasure of her brother, who has a rivalry with Kadamban.

Cast

Arya as Kadamban
Catherine Tresa as Radhi
Deepraj Rana as Mahendran
Super Subbarayan as Moopa
Madhusudhan Rao as Basil Raju
 Amruth Kalam as Muthu
Aadukalam Murugadoss
Y. Gee. Mahendra
Madhuvanti Arun
Usha Elizabeth as Radhi's mother
DMJ Rajasimhan as Radhi's brother
Ethiraj as Ranger Karuna
Kadhal Saravanan as Mahendran's assistant
Dr. Sabu Issac as Doctor
Madurai Saroja

Production
In January 2015, Ragava and Vikram Prabhu announced that they would work on an action adventure film together, with Ilaiyaraaja signed on to compose the film's music. The film was reported to be titled as Thanni Kaattu Raja, but was postponed.

In December 2015, Ragava announced that he would make the action adventure film with Arya in the lead role, and that it would be set in the backdrop of a jungle. Catherine Tresa was signed on as heroine, while Yuvan Shankar Raja was soon after announced as the film's music composer. For his role in the film, Arya underwent a very rigorous training, he took charge of his lifestyle, underwent a complete makeover and sported a striking muscular physique. The film began shooting in March 2016 in the forests of Kodaikanal and the terrain was rough and challenging. The team realised this shoot was going to be like no other, they took on every challenge the jungle had to throw at them; even as simple as mobile network coverage was hard to find, the team requested local operators to put up four communications towers. In May 2016, the film's actual title was revealed to be Kadamban. For the shooting of the climax scene, 70 elephants were used. Catherine Tresa says that, Kadamban is a saga with a social message to love forest and the simple ways of nature; this is indeed an eye opener for the betterment of the country.

Soundtrack

The soundtrack was composed by Yuvan Shankar Raja and released on TrendMusic.

Reception

Behindwoods rated the Music 2.5 /5 and noted it as "A passable adventure by Yuvan for Kadamban that is just about competent !"

Release
Kadamban was a success at the box office. It wasn't a good profitable deal but still the makers enjoyed some revenue. The movie was made on a big budget of 40 cr. Satellite rights were sold to Colors Tamil. Baradwaj Rangan of Film Companion wrote "Avatar meets Lagaan in the Ragava-directed Kadamban (Protector)...the result is long and a bit of a mishmash, but not entirely unwatchable."

References

External links
 
 

2017 films
2010s Tamil-language films
2017 action drama films
Films scored by Yuvan Shankar Raja
Films set in forests
Films shot in Kodaikanal
Indian epic films
Indian action drama films
Super Good Films films